Klaus Bietenholz (December 29, 1924 – 23 Mai 2015) was a Swiss painter of "Organic Cubism Art". Over the years he painted over 300 art pieces. An admirer of Paul Klee, Juan Gris, Alexander Calder, and César Manrique, his painting reflect a mastery of colors and intricate composition.

Co-founder of the Sound Studio "Proton" in Zürich, he successfully worked on thousands of projects such as feature films, advertising, film and radio spots and broadcasting.
Klaus lived and worked in Zürich, Switzerland. His daughter Barbara Bietenholz is also a painter.

References

 
 A portrait of Klaus Bietenholtz by Author Kaspar Schnetzler (in German)
 "Diese Töne und Soundeffekte sind das Werk von dem Tonassistenten in Geld und Geist namens Klaus Bietenholz, der auch in anderen Filmen von Franz Schnyder als Tonassistent mitgewirkt hatte."
Bachelorarbeit Brenda Jarolímková - MASARYK-UNIVERSITÄT IN BRÜNN

External links
Paintings
 Some of Klaus Bietenholz Paintings

Movies
 Klaus Bietenholz on imdb: https://www.imdb.com/name/nm2321682/
 Klaus Bietenholz on Film Portal: http://www.filmportal.de/person/klaus-bietenholz_af3db7d9397c4dc3a9dbed9bc9db8f3a
 Portrait of the movie ″Heidi & Peter″ and the movie ″SOS-Gletcher Pilot″: http://www.cyranos.ch/

1924 births
2015 deaths
Swiss artists